The 2000 season was the New York Giants' 76th in the National Football League (NFL) and the fourth under head coach Jim Fassel.

The season marked the Giants' "NY" helmet logo returning again for the first full season since 1975. The team finished with a record of 12–4, and in the playoffs, they defeated the Philadelphia Eagles in the Divisional round 20–10, then shut out the Minnesota Vikings in the NFC Championship game 41–0, making it to Super Bowl XXXV, where they lost to the Baltimore Ravens 7–34.

Offseason

NFL Draft

Personnel

Staff

Roster

Preseason

Regular season 
The Giants began the 2000 season hoping to get over the hump of coming short during their past two seasons. They would go on to finish the year with a 12–4 record and represented the NFC in Super Bowl XXXV.

With revived quarterback Kerry Collins the passing game improved from a previously mediocre attack. The running game averaged 125.6 yards per game with Ron Dayne and Tiki Barber. The defense allowed just 246 points, with its greatest strength being against the run allowing a third-best 3.2 yards per carry.

Early in the season the Giants’ record stood at 7–2 and coming off two double digit wins, before they lost two straight home games to decline to 7–4. That was when Head Coach Jim Fassel made a bold move and publicly stated in the postgame press conference: "This team is going to the playoffs". This became the defining moment of the season, and the Giants won their next five games to become the #1 seed in the NFC playoffs.

Schedule 

Note: Intra-division opponents are in bold text.

Standings

Game Summaries

Week 1 (Sunday September 3, 2000): vs. Arizona Cardinals 

at Giants Stadium, East Rutherford, New Jersey

 Game time: 1:00 p.m. EST

The Giants began their season at home against the Cardinals. In the first quarter, the Giants took a 7–0 lead with running back Tiki Barber running for a 10-yard touchdown, which he followed with a 78-yard touchdown run in the second quarter to make it 14–0 at the half. In the fourth quarter, rookie running back Ron Dayne added a 7-yard touchdown to make it 21–3 Giants. Late in the game, the Cardinals launched a furious comeback. Cardinals quarterback Jake Plummer found wide receiver David Boston for a touchdown to make it 21–10 with 1:55 to go, then after the Cardinals recovered an onside kick, Plummer hit Boston again for a 25-yard touchdown pass to make it 21–16 with 32 seconds left. However, the ensuing onside kick attempt went out of bounds and the game then ended.

The game was delayed for 23 minutes due to thunder in the surrounding area, forcing both teams to take shelter in their respective locker rooms.

Although it was a relatively unimpressive win for the Giants considering the close game against the eventually 3–13 Cardinals (who also finished last in DVOA for the 2000 season according to Football Outsiders), the Giants were 1–0. The game also introduced the football world to "Thunder and Lightning," the nickname given to the Ron Dayne-Tiki Barber running back tandem. Barber ran for 144 yards on just 13 carries with 2 touchdowns, while Dayne ran for 78 yards and the other Giants touchdown on 23 carries.

Week 2 (Sunday September 10, 2000): at Philadelphia Eagles 

at Veterans Stadium, Philadelphia, Pennsylvania

 Game time: 1:00 p.m. EST

With the Giants coming off a close win over the woeful Cardinals and the Eagles coming off a blowout win despite extreme heat in Dallas, the Eagles were favored on their home turf in this Week 2 matchup. However, the Giants came away with an impressive win.

A close game became a rout in the final minute of the first half. With a minute left in that half, quarterback Kerry Collins found receiver Amani Toomer for a 25-yard touchdown to make the score 13–3 Giants. On the ensuing drive, the Giants forced a three-and-out with a sack by Pete Monty and got the ball back, then Tiki Barber ran for a 31-yard touchdown to make the score 20–3 at halftime. In the third quarter, Collins hit receiver Ike Hilliard for a 30-yard touchdown to make the score 27–6, their largest lead of the game.

Week 3 (Sunday September 17, 2000): at Chicago Bears 

at Soldier Field, Chicago, Illinois

 Game time: 3:15 p.m. CST (4:15 EST)

The Giants next traveled to Chicago to take on the 0–2 Bears. They struck first with Kerry Collins hitting rookie wide receiver Ron Dixon for a 34-yard touchdown to make the score 7–0. Late in the first half, the Bears executed a two-minute drill with quarterback Cade McNown hitting Eddie Kennison for a touchdown with 14 seconds left in the half to tie the score at 7. In the third quarter, Tiki Barber ran in for a 3-yard touchdown, and the Giants defense held the rest of the way.

With this win, the Giants were 3–0 for the first time since 1993.

Week 4 (Sunday September 24, 2000): vs. Washington Redskins 

at Giants Stadium, East Rutherford, New Jersey

 Game time: 8:30 p.m. EST

The Giants then traveled home to take on the Redskins in a Sunday Night game, their first primetime game of the season. Washington dominated for much of the game as many of their aging veterans made an impact. In the second quarter, Redskins quarterback Brad Johnson opened the scoring by hitting longtime Dolphin Irving Fryar for a 23-yard touchdown, and they led 10–0 at the half. In the third quarter, a Johnson touchdown pass to longtime Bill Andre Reed made the score 16–0. The Giants' only score came on a Kerry Collins touchdown pass to Ike Hilliard with less than 3 minutes remaining.

Week 5 (Sunday October 1, 2000): at Tennessee Titans 

at Adelphia Coliseum, Nashville, Tennessee

 Game time: 1:00 p.m. EST

After their Sunday night loss, the Giants traveled to Nashville to take on the Titans. Heading into the game, the Titans were undefeated at 10–0 in Adelphia Coliseum, and would remain undefeated after this contest.

In the first quarter, Titans quarterback Steve McNair found tight end Frank Wycheck for a 14-yard touchdown to make the score 7–0. In the second quarter, running back Eddie George added a 7-yard rushing touchdown, then McNair hit receiver Derrick Mason in tight coverage for a 29-yard touchdown to make the score 21–0 Titans at the half. The Giants got on the board in the third quarter with Kerry Collins finding Ike Hilliard for a 14-yard touchdown. However, in the fourth quarter, McNair hit Frank Wycheck for his second touchdown of the day to make the score 28–7 and put the game out of reach.

The Giants were outgained 436-215 and were held to just 24 yards rushing. The "Thunder and Lightning" combo of Tiki Barber and Ron Dayne were held to just 1 combined yard on a combined 8 carries.

Week 6 (Sunday October 8, 2000): at Atlanta Falcons 

at Georgia Dome, Atlanta, Georgia

 Game time: 4:05 p.m. EST

In the first quarter of this contest against the Falcons, Ron Dayne scored the game's only touchdown to make the score 7–0. With Chris Chandler injured early in the second quarter, former Giant Danny Kanell took over at QB in this contest. At the two-minute warning, a pass interference penalty by Giants cornerback Dave Thomas put the ball at the Giants' 10 with the Falcons needing a touchdown to tie the score. However, a sack by defensive end Michael Strahan and three incomplete passes by Kanell clinched the game for the Giants.

The Giants held the Falcons to just 13 yards rushing in this game.

Week 7 (Sunday October 15, 2000): vs. Dallas Cowboys 

at Giants Stadium, East Rutherford, New Jersey

 Game time: 1:00 p.m. EST

While the Giants again didn't play great, Cowboys quarterback Troy Aikman was even worse with 5 interceptions in this Week 7 matchup against the Giants' archrival, the Cowboys.

On the first play from scrimmage, Troy Aikman went long for Raghib Ismail, and his pass was underthrown and intercepted by Jason Sehorn. Early in the second quarter with the game still scoreless, the Cowboys drove into the Giants' red zone, but safety Shaun Williams intercepted Aikman in the end zone to end the scoring threat. On the Cowboys' next drive, Dave Thomas intercepted Aikman on a slant play. Unlike the other picks, this one wasn't Aikman's fault as his intended receiver, James McKnight, slipped while running his route. The Giants finally capitalized on this miscue with Kerry Collins finding Pete Mitchell for a one-yard touchdown pass to finally open the scoring. With less than a minute left in the half, the Cowboys went for the bomb to Damon Hodge for a potential game-tying touchdown. While Hodge beat Giants corner Reggie Stephens down the field, Aikman's pass was again underthrown and Stephens was able to catch up and intercept the pass. The score was 7–0 Giants at halftime.

The Cowboys finally got on the board in the third quarter with Troy Aikman finding Robert Thomas for a 1-yard touchdown pass to make the score 10–7. After a Brad Daluiso field goal by the Giants, Cowboys running back Emmitt Smith ran for a 3-yard touchdown to make the score 14–13 Cowboys heading into the final quarter. However, with 13:16 left in the game, Aikman threw his fifth interception of the game, this one to linebacker Micheal Barrow. The Giants capitalized by scoring the go-ahead touchdown on a 3-yard Ron Dayne touchdown run.

Week 9 (Sunday October 29, 2000): vs. Philadelphia Eagles 

at Giants Stadium, East Rutherford, New Jersey

 Game time: 4:05 p.m. EST

The Giants dominated their second game against the Eagles for the season. In the first quarter, Ron Dayne ran in for a one-yard touchdown to make the score 7–0 Giants. The Giants added another touchdown in the second quarter with Kerry Collins hitting Amani Toomer for a 27-yard touchdown pass, and the Giants led 14–0 at the half. In the fourth quarter, reserve running back Joe Montgomery added his first touchdown of the season with a 4-yard touchdown to give the Giants a 24–0 lead.

The Giants outgained the Eagles 384–192. Amani Toomer caught 9 passes for 108 yards and a touchdown.

Week 10 (Sunday November 5, 2000): at Cleveland Browns 

at Cleveland Browns Stadium, Cleveland, Ohio

 Game time: 1:00 p.m. EST

With the Browns coming into the game with a 2–6 record having scored a combined 3 points in their previous 2 games, this matchup had all the makings of a blowout. However, it was the Browns who struck first, with kicker Phil Dawson kicking a 19-yard field goal to give the Browns a 3–0 lead at the end of the first quarter. In the second quarter, Kerry Collins found Ike Hilliard for a 28-yard touchdown pass, and the Giants led 10–3 at the half. In the second half, Collins hit Amani Toomer for two more touchdown passes, one from 17 yards and the other from 32 yards.

For the second straight week, the Giants held their opponent to under 200 yards of total offense while registering four sacks.

With this win, the Giants were 7–2 and in first place in the NFC East.

Week 11 (Sunday November 12, 2000): vs. St. Louis Rams 

at Giants Stadium, East Rutherford, New Jersey

 Game time: 4:15 p.m. EST

The Giants headed home next to take on the Rams, who were also 7–2 heading into the matchup. The Rams were playing without starting quarterback Kurt Warner and running back Marshall Faulk, however backup quarterback Trent Green lit up the Giants for 4 touchdown passes and a rushing touchdown as the Giants' 4 game winning streak came to an end.

In the first quarter, Amani Toomer lost a fumble deep in Giants territory, and the ball was recovered by Rams cornerback Dexter McCleon, who went down at the 1 yard line. On the next play, Trent Green found tight end Roland Williams for the game's opening score. Later in the quarter, Green hit Torry Holt for a 5-yard touchdown to make the score 14–0 Rams at the end of the first quarter. Although the Giants got on the board in the second quarter with Kerry Collins hitting Tiki Barber for a 13-yard touchdown, but Green struck back, hitting Ricky Proehl for an 8-yard touchdown pass. After Collins was picked off by McCleon, Green ran for a 14-yard touchdown run to make the score 28–7 Rams at the half. In the third quarter, Green's fifth touchdown of the day, a 34-yard touchdown pass to Issac Bruce, made the score 38–17 Rams heading into the fourth quarter.

Week 12 (Sunday November 19, 2000): vs. Detroit Lions 

at Giants Stadium, East Rutherford, New Jersey

 Game time: 1:00 p.m. EST

Without a doubt, the low point of the Giants' season was their Week 12 loss to the Detroit Lions, a game that was nowhere close to being as competitive as the final score indicated.

After a scoreless first quarter, the second quarter was a Lions onslaught. Lions quarterback Charlie Batch found tight end Walter Rasby for a 5-yard touchdown to make the score 7–0. After kick returner Desmond Howard returned the punt on the Giants' ensuing drive 50 yards, running back James Stewart ran in for a one-yard touchdown plunge to make the score 14–0 Lions. With less than 50 seconds to go in the half, punter Brad Maynard's punt was blocked, and the Lions capitalized with Batch finding veteran receiver Herman Moore for a 6-yard touchdown to make the score 21–0 Detroit at the half. Even when the Giants appeared to make good plays, they were stymied by a penalty or turnover. In the quarter, Tiki Barber returned a punt 67 yards in order to give the Giants great field position, but the play was called back due to a holding penalty by Bashir Levingston. Later in the quarter, Levingston fumbled a kickoff return. Head coach Jim Fassel was so enraged by Levingston's poor play that he cut him just one day after the game, making this his final NFL game.

In the third quarter, Charlie Batch hit receiver Johnnie Morton, who outran Jason Sehorn to the end zone for a 32-yard touchdown to make it 28–0. As if being outrun for the touchdown wasn't enough, Sehorn's pants were falling down on the play. While the Giants did score three touchdowns later in the game, no one was fooled as the game had long been decided.

While the Giants were still 7–4 and a half-game behind the division lead, many critics began to relentlessly attack the team for their poor performance (particularly regarding this game), and questioned whether or not they had the ability to even make the playoffs after a 7–2 start. The loss also put Jim Fassel on an even hotter seat, as he needed to get his team to the playoffs in order to save his job in the final year of his contract.

Week 13 (Sunday November 26, 2000): at Arizona Cardinals 

at Sun Devil Stadium, Tempe, Arizona

 Game time: 6:30 p.m. MST (8:30 EST)

The first game for the Giants after Jim Fassel's guarantee was this Sunday night clash against the Arizona Cardinals, who were playing with backup quarterback Dave Brown starting in place of the injured Jake Plummer.

After two straight poor performances, the Giants dominated the entire game. In the first quarter, Kerry Collins found Dan Campbell for a 5-yard touchdown to open the scoring. A Ron Dayne touchdown made the score 14–0 Giants at the half. In the second half Tiki Barber also added a touchdown with a 23-yard run, and even wide receiver Amani Toomer scored a rushing touchdown on a 19-yard reverse.

Defensive tackle Keith Hamilton had a particularly outstanding day for the Giants with 3 sacks.

Week 14 (Sunday December 3, 2000): at Washington Redskins 

at Fedex Field, Landover, Maryland

 Game time: 1:00 p.m. EST

The Giants then went to Maryland to take on the Redskins in a game with huge playoff implications for both teams. While the Giants were trying to keep pace with the division-leading Eagles, Washington was in a must-win situation. After a 6–2 start, they had lost 3 of their previous 4 games, including a close loss to the Eagles at home after kicker Eddie Murray had missed a potential game-tying field goal.

A very evenly matched game ensued. The Giants led 6–0 at halftime after Brad Daluiso kicked two field goals in the second quarter. In the third quarter, Daluiso added another field goal to make the score 9–0 heading into the final quarter. After Washington quarterback Brad Johnson was intercepted twice in the second half with his second interception being thrown to Giants corner Emmanuel McDaniel with 12:22 remaining, Johnson was benched and replaced with Jeff George, one of owner Daniel Snyder's high-priced free-agent acquisitions in the offseason. George started by leading a 97-yard drive, capped off by a touchdown pass to Irving Fryar to narrow the score to 9–7. The Giants got the ball back and attempted to run out the clock, but the Redskins' defense shut down the Giants' running game and forced them to punt. The situation appeared to look bleak for the Giants as George led the Redskins to the Giants' 35 yard line, near position for a game-winning field goal with 1:26 to go. With the aid of an overturned non-catch by James Thrash, the Giants finally held, forcing a 4th down with 56 seconds left. Washington called their final timeout and sent out 44-year old Eddie Murray to attempt a game-winning field goal, but his attempt was short and not even close to reaching the crossbar.

This loss played a key role in the Redskins' failing to reach the postseason despite a 6–2 start and considerable preseason hype regarding their free-agent signings. The next day, Dan Snyder fired head coach Norv Turner and named Terry Robiskie the interim head coach, ushering in a five-year stretch where the team would have five head coaches in five years.

On the other hand, the Giants were now at 9–4 and in first place in the NFC East due to the Eagles' loss to the Titans.

Week 15 (Sunday December 10, 2000): vs. Pittsburgh Steelers 

at Giants Stadium, East Rutherford, New Jersey

 Game time: 1:00 p.m. EST

The Giants returned home after their big win over Washington and blew out the Steelers in a game that could have been even worse than the final score indicated.

The Giants took a 6–0 lead early in the game. During one of the field goal-scoring drives, Kerry Collins appeared to throw a touchdown to Ike Hilliard (back in the lineup after being injured in the Detroit game), but the refs correctly ruled that Hilliard had been out of bounds before he made the catch. Later in the second quarter, in a role reversal, the Giants used Tiki Barber at the goal line rather than Ron Dayne, and he went inside for a 3-yard touchdown to make the score 13–3 at the half.

Ike Hilliard eventually did get in the end zone with a 9-yard touchdown pass from Kerry Collins, and the score was 20–3 Giants. On the last play of the third quarter, Collins found Hilliard again, and he cut to the middle of the field appearing to be off for a 66-yard touchdown, but Steelers safety Ainsley Battles somehow made the tackle at the 7 yard line after being blocked by fullback Greg Comella, and the Giants settled for a field goal to make it 23–3 early in the fourth quarter. With one more chance to stay in the game due to Battles's touchdown-saving tackle, the Steelers drove to the Giants' 2 yard line, but defensive tackle Cedric Jones sacked Steelers quarterback Kordell Stewart on 3rd down, then on 4th down Stewart was intercepted by Reggie Stephens to effectively end any hope the Steelers had. Collins then drove the Giants down the field and threw an insurance touchdown to Amani Toomer to make the score 30–3 with less than 3 minutes remaining.

Kerry Collins went 24 of 35 for 333 yards and 3 touchdowns, while Amani Toomer added 9 receptions for 136 yards and a touchdown. The Giants defense held the Steelers to 47 yards rushing.

Week 16 (Sunday December 17, 2000): at Dallas Cowboys 

at Texas Stadium, Irving, Texas

 Game time: 7:30 p.m. CST (8:30 EST)

The Giants were expected to win easily in this Sunday night matchup with the Cowboys, but instead the game turned into a hard-fought victory.

To the surprise of many, the first half was all Cowboys. Emmitt Smith ran in for a 1-yard touchdown to make it 7–0 Cowboys, then Cowboys kicker Tim Seder added two field goals to make the score 13–0 Dallas at the half. But the Giants turned the tables in the second half. In the third quarter, Kerry Collins threw a 33-yard touchdown pass to Amani Toomer to make the score 13–7. Then in the fourth quarter, an interception by Emmanuel McDaniel set up a Tiki Barber 13-yard touchdown to give the Giants their first lead of the day, 14–13. With less than 2 minutes remaining, a fourth-down stop by Micheal Barrow effectively ended the Cowboys' chance for an upset win.

The Giants held the Cowboys to just 145 yards of total offense with Michael Strahan registering 2.5 sacks.

This win clinched the division for the Giants, who were 11–4 and held the tiebreaker over the 10–5 Eagles due to having swept them on the season. As a result, coach Jim Fassel's guarantee had been validated.

Week 17 (Saturday December 23, 2000): vs. Jacksonville Jaguars 

at Giants Stadium, East Rutherford, New Jersey

 Game time: 12:30 p.m. EST

With the Giants holding the tiebreaker over the Vikings due to better divisional record, a win in their Week 17 game against future coach Tom Coughlin's Jaguars on a Saturday afternoon would clinch home-field advantage throughout the NFC playoffs.

The game started relatively slowly. At the end of three quarters the Jaguars led 10–7. Tiki Barber had run for the opening score to make it 7–0 Giants, but the Jaguars answered with running back Fred Taylor rushing for a 44-yard touchdown. However, in the fourth quarter, a defensive battle turned into a shootout. With 11:11 to go, Kerry Collins found Ike Hilliard for a 5-yard touchdown pass that allowed the Giants to regain the lead, 14–10. Later in the quarter, Collins hit Amani Toomer for a 54-yard touchdown to make the score 21–10 with 3:05 to go and seemingly clinch the game. However, the Jaguars were not done. Jaguars quarterback Mark Brunell drove the Jags down the field and threw a touchdown pass to tight end Kyle Brady with 1:56 to go, and the two-point conversion made the score 21–18. Because they needed another score, the Jaguars attempted an onside kick, but it backfired as Jason Sehorn recovered the ball before it went 10 yards and returned it 38 yards for a touchdown to make it 28–18. Needing two scores again, Brunell drove the Jags for another touchdown, this one to Alvis Whitted, to make the score 28–25 with just 19 seconds remaining. Jags kicker Mike Hollis attempted another onside kick, which was recovered again by Sehorn.

Kerry Collins was 22 of 39 for 321 yards and 2 touchdowns, with 1 interception. Amani Toomer had an outstanding day, catching 8 balls for 193 yards and a touchdown.

With this win, the Giants earned home-field advantage and a first round bye.

Postseason 
In the divisional playoffs, the Giants defeated MVP runner-up Donovan McNabb and the Philadelphia Eagles 20–10, in which rookie WR Ron Dixon returned the opening kickoff for a touchdown, and Jason Sehorn intercepted a McNabb pass for a touchdown. The win was the third by the Giants over the Eagles for the season.

In the NFC Championship against the favored Minnesota Vikings, Kerry Collins threw five TDs (including two to Ike Hilliard) as they progressed to the franchise's 3rd Super Bowl by demolishing Minnesota 41–0. Combined with the Giants only other NFC championship game played at home (1986), the Giants have outscored their two opponents 58–0 in home NFC championship games.

In the Super Bowl, playing against arguably the greatest defense in history, the Giants were dominated and lost Super Bowl XXXV 34–7 against the Baltimore Ravens. Kerry Collins threw four interceptions, including one that was returned for a TD; the Giants scored their only touchdown with a Ron Dixon 97-yd second-half kickoff return. It was the Giants' only Super Bowl loss.

Game Summaries

Divisional Round (Sunday January 7th, 2001): vs. Philadelphia Eagles 

at Giants Stadium, East Rutherford, New Jersey

 Game Time: 4:15 p.m. EST
 TV: FOX
 Announcers: Pat Summerall, John Madden, and D.J. Johnson

After a first-round bye, the Giants hosted the Eagles in the divisional round, with the winner taking on the Vikings in the NFC Championship. The pressure was on the Giants in this one. While the Giants had swept the Eagles in the regular season, the Eagles had finished 6–1 after their second loss, and had just dominated the Bucs in the first round. In a largely ugly game where both teams committed three turnovers apiece, two big plays by the Giants would be the difference.

The Giants won the toss and elected to receive. Ron Dixon fielded the opening kickoff and blew past the entire Eagles coverage unit untouched for a 97-yard kickoff return touchdown. On the first play of the second quarter, Brad Daluiso's field goal made the score 10–0 Giants. Late in the second quarter, the Eagles had the ball deep in their own territory, attempting to begin a two-minute drill to change the game. Donovan McNabb dropped back and threw an out pattern to receiver Torrance Small when Jason Sehorn jumped in front of the pass and broke it up. While he dove, the ball stayed in the air, and Sehorn got back up and intercepted the pass, returning it 32 yards for a touchdown. A field goal by David Akers made the score 17–3 Giants at the half.

Hardly any notable plays occurred in the second half as both teams struggled to move the ball. The Eagles scored their only touchdown late in the game, when the Eagles blocked a punt to set up a 10-yard touchdown pass from Donovan McNabb to Torrance Small with 1:56 left. But the game had long been decided by this point.

The Giants held the Eagles to just 186 yards of total offense. Donovan McNabb, who had finished second in MVP voting for the 2000 season, was held to completing less than half his pass attempts (20–41) and just 17 yards rushing. Michael Strahan led the defense with 2 sacks as the defense sacked McNabb 6 times.

NFC Championship (Sunday January 14th, 2001): vs. Minnesota Vikings 

at Giants Stadium, East Rutherford, New Jersey

 Game Time: 12:30 p.m. EST
 TV: FOX
 Announcers: Pat Summerall, John Madden, D.J. Johnson, and Pam Oliver
 Referee: Tony Corrente

In order to represent the NFC in Super Bowl XXXV, the Giants would battle it out against the Minnesota Vikings, who finished the regular season 11–5 and featured a high-flying offense featuring first-year starting quarterback Daunte Culpepper, running back Robert Smith, wide receivers Randy Moss and Cris Carter, and tackles Korey Stringer and Todd Steussie. Although they had lost their final three regular season games and had finished 28th in the league in total defense, as well as the fact that they would have to play outdoors in a cold-weather city on grass, the Vikings were favored to defeat the Giants and represent the NFC in the Super Bowl, with nearly all football analysts predicting the Vikings to win. These same critics claimed that in order for the Giants to win, they would have to rely heavily on the ground game to control the clock and keep the Vikings' offense off the field.

However, the Giants were planning a completely different game. Offensive Coordinator Sean Payton studied footage of the Vikings' defense and was so appalled at their secondary (particularly starting corners Robert Tate and Wassawa Serwanga) that he boldly stated at the Giants' first meeting before the game that they would throw for over 300 yards in the first half. This set the stage for one of the most lopsided games in NFC Championship history.

The Giants won the toss and elected to receive, and immediately picked the Vikings' secondary apart. Kerry Collins began the game by hitting Amani Toomer, who had hardly practiced all week due to an injury, on a slant pattern for 16 yards. After a 10-yard pass to Toomer and a running play, Collins found a wide-open Ike Hilliard on a four verticals play for a 46-yard touchdown, making the score 7–0 just five plays into the game. On the ensuing kickoff, Brad Daluiso's kick was poor, but Vikings running back Moe Williams misplayed the ball and fumbled. The Vikings had first shot at the ball, but the Giants' Lyle West recovered the ball at the Vikings' 18 yard line. On the very next play, Collins went for the end zone again for seldom-used fullback Greg Comella, and Comella caught the pass while falling into the end zone for another Giants touchdown. Just 2:13 into the game, the Giants led 14–0.

The Vikings' two best chances to score came later in the first quarter. Troy Walters returned the ensuing kickoff 24 yards to give the Vikings good field position at the 39 yard line, but a false start penalty pushed them out of field goal range and they punted. On the next drive, Kerry Collins threw an interception to Robert Tate, and the Vikings attempted to capitalize with Daunte Culpepper throwing to the end zone, but Emmanuel McDaniel stole the pass from Carter for an interception.

After another Collins interception, the Giants got back to work. Brad Daluiso kicked a field goal to make the score 17–0 in the first play of the second quarter. On the Giants' next drive, a 43-yard pass to Ron Dixon set up an 8-yard touchdown pass to Joe Jurevicius to make the score 24–0. Another Brad Daluiso field goal made the score 27–0, and then Collins found Hilliard for the second time for a touchdown with 12 seconds to go in the half to make the score 34–0 Giants at the half. True to Sean Payton's word, Collins had over 300 yards passing by this point.

On the first play from scrimmage in the second half, Shaun Williams sacked Daunte Culpepper and forced him to fumble, and the ball was recovered by Cornelius Griffin at the Vikings' 29 yard line. Kerry Collins then found Amani Toomer in the back of the end zone for a 7-yard touchdown to complete the scoring, 41–0.

Because the game was so lopsided, hardly any notable plays or events occurred after this. With the game having long been decided, both backup quarterback and longtime Cowboy Jason Garrett and seldom-used running back Joe Montgomery got extensive playing time in the fourth quarter, with Garrett completing his only pass attempt of the season. Frustration on the Vikings' side boiled over with Troy Walters being ejected for an unsportsmanlike conduct penalty late in the third quarter.

The Giants completely dominated on both sides of the ball, outgaining the Vikings 518–114. They outgained the Vikings 380–60 in net passing and held the ball for 42:22 to 17:38 for the Vikings.

Kerry Collins went 28 of 39 for 381 yards and 5 touchdowns. Although he also threw 2 interceptions, it hardly mattered as the Vikings converted neither of them into points. It is considered by many to be his single greatest game during his NFL career, which spanned 17 seasons with 6 different teams. Ike Hilliard caught 10 passes for 155 yards and 2 touchdowns.

On defense, the Giants completely shut down the Vikings' star players. Daunte Culpepper was held to just 78 yards passing with 3 interceptions, Randy Moss was held to 2 catches for 18 yards, and Cris Carter was held to 3 catches for 24 yards.

This was Vikings running back Robert Smith's final NFL game, as he retired in the offseason. It was also Vikings left tackle Korey Stringer's final game in the NFL, as he died from heatstroke during the Vikings' 2001 training camp. The NFC Championship loss sent the Vikings into a tailspin over the next two seasons, with the team going just 11–21 during that span.

With this win, the Giants earned the right to go to Super Bowl XXXV two weeks later in Tampa. After this game concluded, the Baltimore Ravens defeated the Raiders in Oakland
to earn the right to face the Giants. The Giants would once again be underdogs against the Ravens' dominant defense in their quest for a Super Bowl championship.

Super Bowl XXXV (Sunday January 28th, 2001): vs. Baltimore Ravens 

at Raymond James Stadium, Tampa, Florida

 Game Time: 6:28 p.m. EST
 TV: CBS
 Announcers: Greg Gumbel, Phil Simms, Bonnie Bernstein, and Armen Keteyian

See also 
 List of New York Giants seasons

References

External links 
 2000 New York Giants at Pro-Football-Reference.com

New York Giants seasons
NFC East championship seasons
National Football Conference championship seasons
New York Giants
New York Giants season
20th century in East Rutherford, New Jersey
Meadowlands Sports Complex